Pōmare I (c. 1753 – September 3, 1803) (fully in old orthography: Tu-nui-ea-i-te-atua-i-Tarahoi Vaira'atoa Taina Pōmare I; also known as Tu or Tinah or Outu, or more formally as Tu-nui-e-a'a-i-te-atua) was the unifier and first king of Tahiti and founder of the Pōmare dynasty and the Kingdom of Tahiti between 1788 and 1791. He abdicated in 1791 but remained in power as the guardian regent during the minority of his successor Pōmare II from 1791 until 1803. He is best known in the western world for being the ruler of Tahiti during the mutiny on the Bounty in 1789.

Name
Outu is the phonetic English rendering of O Tū, Tū being the name, o the nominal predicate meaning that is. Older literature writes his family name as Tunuieaiteatua, which leaves incertainties about the proper pronunciation as Tahitian usually did (and does) not write macrons and glottals. Barring this incertainty, in the current proper orthography would be Tū-nui-ēa-i-te-atua meaning Great-Tū,-road-to-the-god. Tū (standing straight up) was a major Tahitian god.

Ariitaimai claims that this Tū is a contraction of atua (god), but that is unlikely. The name Pōmare was adopted later. Pō-mare means "night cougher", a nickname he took, as was common in that time, in honor of his daughter Princess Teri’inavahoroa who died from tuberculosis in 1792. Because "Pō" was used as part of his name as the king, the Tahitian word for "night" was replaced by "ruʻi".

Biography
Tu was the son of Teu, chief of Pare-'Arue, and his wife, Tetupaia-i-Hauiri (Tetupaia).  Tetupaia was the granddaughter of Tamatoa II of Raiatea.  Tu's great uncle was Tutaha, who acted as his regent. 

Born at Pare, ca. 1753, he initially reigned under the regency of his father and succeeded on the death of his father as Arii-rahi of Porionuu on November 23, 1802.  Pōmare further succeeded in uniting the different chiefdoms of Tahiti into a single kingdom, composed of the islands of Tahiti itself, Moorea, Mehetia, and the Tetiaroa group. He thus became the first king of unified Tahiti in 1788. 

One year into his reign as Tahiti's king, Pōmare hosted the crew of HMS Bounty who had visited Tahiti to collect breadfruit plants for transportation to the West Indies. The subsequent mutiny on the Bounty caused the mutineers to return briefly to Tahiti, where they were under Pōmare's protection, until leaving the island and eventually relocating to Pitcairn. A small number of mutineers stayed behind and were later located by HMS Pandora, to which Pōmare accepted British authority and allowed the mutineers to be arrested and taken back to England for trial.

Pōmare's service as the first king of unified Tahiti ended when he abdicated in 1791. He was succeeded by Tū Tūnuiʻēʻaiteatua Pōmare II, who reigned from 1791 until 1821: however, though no longer monarch, Pomare remained regent of Tahiti during the minority of Pomare II, from 1791 until 1803. In 1792, HMS Providence visited Tahiti and Pōmare was reunited with William Bligh, the victim of mutiny four years earlier. Bligh interviewed Pōmare regarding the mutineers and subsequently wrote an account of where he suspected the mutineers may have escaped to following their departure from Tahiti.   

Pōmare married 4 times and had three sons and three daughters. He died from thrombosis.

Dramatic portrayals

Due to Pōmare's role as King of Tahiti during the Mutiny on the Bounty, the character has subsequently been portrayed in every dramatic film about the incident since 1935. In both of the original film, as well as the remake from 1962, he is known as "Chief Hitihiti" and played respectively by Bill Bambridge and Matahiariʻi Tama. In the 1984 film The Bounty he is known as "King Tynah" and is portrayed by New Zealand actor Wi Kuki Kaa.  Historically, Tynah may have been a different individual from Pōmare, as he is mentioned in the Bounty log as a "Paramount Chief", a title separate from monarch.

Ancestry

References

Teuira Henry; Ancient Tahiti / Tahiti aux temps anciens
Henry Adams; Memoirs of Arii Taimai / Mémoires d'Arii Taimai

Pōmare dynasty
Tahitian monarchs
1753 births
1803 deaths
18th-century monarchs in Oceania